Hsieh Hsiang-chun (born 23 September 1974) is a Taiwanese luger. He competed in the men's singles event at the 1998 Winter Olympics.

References

1974 births
Living people
Taiwanese male lugers
Olympic lugers of Taiwan
Lugers at the 1998 Winter Olympics
Place of birth missing (living people)